In the UEFA qualification for the 2007 FIFA Women's World Cup, the 25 teams belonging to the First Category of European women's football were drawn into five groups, from which the group winners qualified for the World Cup finals. The qualifiers begun on 9 July 2005 and concluded on 30 September 2006, with five teams qualified: Denmark, England, Germany, Norway and Sweden. Of these, the latter three had qualified for the 2003 World Cup, while Denmark and England qualified over France (second in England's group) and Russia (second in Germany's group).

First Category

Group 1

Match schedule & results

Group 2

Match schedule & results

Group 3

Match schedule & results

Group 4

Match schedule & results

Group 5

Match schedule & results

Second Category
Teams in this Category had no chance to qualify to the World Cup. Originally, the winners of the second category, along with the two best runners-up (Israel and Romania), were to contest play-off matches against the bottom-placed teams of the first category. The play-off winners would then participate in the first category of UEFA Women's Euro 2009 qualifying. However, the play-offs were cancelled after UEFA changed the qualifying format to no longer be split into two divisions.

Group 6
Armenia and Lithuania withdrew.

Group 7
Azerbaijan withdrew.

Group 8

References and notes

External links
2007 Women's World Cup Preliminaries at FIFA.com

2005 in women's association football
2006 in women's association football
UEFA
Women
Women
2007